Andricus kingi, the red cone gall wasp, is a species of gall wasp in the family Cynipidae.

This species induces galls on various white oak species, such as the valley oak Quercus lobata.

References

External links

 

Cynipidae
Articles created by Qbugbot
Insects described in 1900

Taxa named by Homer Franklin Bassett